Theodore Bloc, O. Crucif. was a pre-Reformation cleric who was appointed the Bishop of Sodor and Man in the early 15th-century.

A monk of the order of the Crucifers, and of the diocese of Utrecht, he was appointed the bishop of the diocese of Sodor and Man by Pope Boniface IX on 16 April 1402. It is not known when his episcopate ended, but his successor Richard Payl was appointed on 30 May 1410.

References 

 
 
 
 
 

15th-century English Roman Catholic bishops
Bishops of Sodor and Man
Year of birth unknown
Year of death unknown